Ageas Federal Life Insurance Co Ltd. (Formerly known as IDBI Federal Life Insurance) is a joint-venture of  Federal Bank, which is a private sector banks in India and Ageas.

Ageas Federal distributes its products through a multi-channel network consisting of Insurance agents, Bancassurance partners (IDBI Bank, Federal Bank) Direct channel, and Insurance Brokers.

History

In the year 2006, IDBI Bank, Federal Bank and Belgian-Dutch insurance major Fortis Insurance International NV signed a MoU to start a life insurance company in India. The company received its license from Insurance Regulatory and Development Authority of India (IRDAI) in December 2007.

IDBI Fortis Life Insurance Co. Ltd. officially began its operations in March 2008. In August 2008, the company collected the premium of over Rs.100 crore within a record time of five months, thus becoming the fastest growing new life insurance company in the private sector.

India-Sri Lanka ODI series that took place in October 2009, found a title sponsor in insurance major IDBI Fortis. The company's AUM crossed the Rs. 1,000 crore mark for the first time in March 2010.

In August 2010, the company was rechristened as IDBI Federal Life Insurance Company. In 2012-13, it declared its maiden profits in record 5 years, thus was one of the fastest to do so in the industry. It yet again clocked Rs. 80 crore profits for the financial year 2013-14 and has maintained its profitable trajectory from thereon.

In 2020 Ageas increased it's share in joint venture to 49% and later to 74% in 2022, upon full exit of IDBI form from the joint venture, the global insurer acquired the additional 25 per cent stake (from IDBI Bank) for a total cash consideration of Rs 5.8 billion (EUR 73 million) and renamed the company as a Ageas Federal.

Key people 

 Vighnesh Shahane as CEO and Director (Full time)
 Lalitha Bhatia as Chief Operating Officer (COO)

See also
 IDBI Bank
 IDBI Intech Ltd.
 Federal Bank Ltd

References

Financial services companies based in Mumbai
Life insurance companies of India
Financial services companies established in 2008
2008 establishments in Maharashtra